David Berry (born 30 August 1960) is an academic and writer.

Bibliography

As author

As editor
 
 

Bounds, Philip; Berry, David (2016) British Marxism & Cultural Studies: Essays on a Living Tradition, Routledge: London.

References

British mass media scholars
Place of birth missing (living people)
British textbook writers
Academics of Solent University
1960 births
Living people